Csanád, also Chanadinus, or Cenad, was the first head (comes) of Csanád County in the Kingdom of Hungary in the first decades of the 11th century.

Csanád defeated and killed Ajtony who had ruled over the region now known as Banat (in Romania and Serbia). Csanád County and its capital (Cenad, in Hungarian Csanád) were named after him.

Life 
The anonymous author of the 13th-century Gesta Ungarorum states that Csanád was the nephew of King Stephen I of Hungary (1000/1001-1038) (nepos regis) and his father's name was Doboka. According to the Long Life of St Gerard, an early 14th-century compilation of different sources, Csanád was a pagan in the service of Ahtum.

Ahtum, whose residence was at “urbs Morisena” on the river Mureș, controlled traffic along the river and taxed transport of salts from Transylvania to the heartland of Pannonia. It was in relation to salt that Ahtum found himself in conflict with Stephen, the newly proclaimed king of Hungary. According to the Long Life, Csanád had been loyal to Ahtum, but later switched sides and at the head of a large army sent by King Stephen I eventually defeated and killed Ahtum. Csanád was subsequently given substantial grants of land in the newly conquered territories of his former lord.

At urbs Morisena, which was given the name of Csanád, a Roman Catholic bishopric was immediately founded, and Gerard, who had hitherto lived as a hermit in the forest of the Bakony, was invited to be its first bishop. By that time Csanád had been baptized and become the head of the royal county (comitatus) organized around the fortress at Cenad. With Csanád's help, Bishop Gerard began his mission in the region and established a monastery dedicated to St George in a place later called Oroszlános (Banatsko Aranđelovo, Serbia), most probably after the carved lions decorating its gates (oroszlán is the Hungarian world for ‘lion’). The Greek monks of the Eastern Orthodox monastery which Ahtum had established at Morisena were also moved to make room for Gerard's newly established bishopric.

Csanád was the ancestor of the genus Chanad/Sunad (Csanád kindred), the site of whose main holdings in Arad, Csanád, Krassó and Temes counties demonstrated a quite remarkable continuity from the 11th to 14th centuries.

See also 
Ahtum
Stephen I of Hungary

References

Sources 
Curta, Florin: Transylvania around A.D. 1000; in: Urbańczyk, Przemysław (Editor): Europe around the year 1000; Wydawn. DiG, 2001; 
Curta, Florin: Southeastern Europe in the Middle Ages - 500-1250; Cambridge University Press, 2006, Cambridge; 
Engel, Pál: The Realm of St Stephen: A History of Medieval Hungary, 895-1526; I. B. Tauris, 2001, London&New York; 
Georgescu, Vlad (Author) – Calinescu, Matei (Editor) – Bley-Vroman, Alexandra (Translator): The Romanians – A History; Ohio State University Press, 1991, Columbus; 
Kristó, Gyula (General Editor) - Engel, Pál - Makk, Ferenc (Editors): Korai Magyar történeti lexikon (9-14. század) /Encyclopedia of the Early Hungarian History (9th-14th centuries)/; Akadémiai Kiadó, 1994, Budapest;  (the entry “Csanád” was written by László Szegfű).
Rady, Martyn: Nobility, Land and Service in Medieval Hungary; Palgrave (in association with School of Slavonic and East European Studies, University College London), 2000, New York;

External links 
 Original Latin text of the Gesta Hungarorum by P. Magister
 English text of the Gesta Hungarorum
 Latin writings and deeds of Saint Gerard of Csanád including the Legenda Maior on the events 
 Legenda Maior of Saint Gerard in Hungarian

Medieval Hungarian nobility
History of Banat
Romania in the Early Middle Ages
11th century in Serbia
Csanád (genus)
11th-century Hungarian people